The Cruxati River is a river of Ceará state in eastern Brazil.

See also
List of rivers of Ceará

References
Brazilian Ministry of Transport

Rivers of Ceará